The 2012–13 HockeyAllsvenskan season was the 8th season of the HockeyAllsvenskan (14th including seasons under the name "Allsvenskan"), the second-highest level of ice hockey in Sweden. The regular season began on 12 September 2012 and ended on 2 March 2013, with the following playoffs and Kvalserien tournaments running until 5 April 2013. Leksands IF, following a season marked by financial instability and scandal, secured first place in the regular season standings, and continued to the qualification round for the 2013–14 SHL/Elitserien season, along with second-place Södertälje SK, third place VIK Västerås HK, and playoff winner Örebro HK.  Meanwhile, 13th- and 14th-ranked Tingsryds AIF and Karlskrona HK were forced to defend their places in HockeyAllsvenskan for the 2013–14 season.

This HockeyAllsvenskan season is notable for the participation of players from the National Hockey League during the 2012–13 NHL lockout.

HockeyAllsvenskan had an average attendance of 3,227 spectators in 2012–13, comfortably the highest attendance of any second-tier league in Europe (beating the 2nd Bundesliga with 2,267), also making HockeyAllsvenskan the eighth most attended European hockey league. It was a 23.8 percent increase over the 2011–12 season's attendance average.

Participating teams

Participating locked-out NHL players

Final standings

Statistics

Average attendance

Post-season

Playoff series
Teams 4–7 qualified for a playoff series (in previous seasons called förkvalserien), in which all the teams played each other home-and-away. The winner, Örebro HK advanced to the qualifiers to Elitserien, which was renamed the SHL prior to the following season.

The teams started the playoffs with points based on their performance in the regular season. 7th-place IK Oskarshamn started with one point, 6th-place Örebro HK with two, 5th-place Djurgårdens IF with three, and 4th-place BIK Karlskoga with four.

Elitserien qualifiers

The 2013 Elitserien qualifiers determined which teams would participate in the 2013–14 season of Elitserien (which would be renamed the SHL during the 2013 offseason). The two teams with the worst records from the 2012–13 Elitserien season (Timrå IK and Rögle BK), along with the three best teams from the 2012–13 HockeyAllsvenskan season (Leksands IF, Södertälje SK, and VIK Västerås HK) and the winner of the HockeyAllsvenskan playoff series (Örebro HK) all played each other twice, once home and once way. Örebro and Leksand finished first and second, and were thus promoted to what would become the SHL. Timrå and Rögle were therefore relegated and would play in the 2013–14 HockeyAllsvenskan season.

HockeyAllsvenskan qualifiers
The two teams ranked 13th and 14th after the regular season, Tingsryds AIF and Karlskrona HK, were forced to play in the Kvalserien qualification series to defend their spots in HockeyAllsvenskan.  They played a double round-robin tournament against the four playoff winners from third-tier Division 1 (IF Björklöven, HC Vita Hästen, Huddinge IK, and Piteå HC).  The series began on 12 March 2013 and ended on 5 April 2013.

Umeå-based IF Björklöven, who were Swedish champions in 1987 and were in Sweden's top hockey league as recently as 2001, finished first in the standings, resulting in their return to HockeyAllsvenskan three years after their 2010 demotion to Division 1 due to financial difficulties.

The second and final spot in HockeyAllsvenskan was decided dramatically in the final round.  Karlskrona went into the final round one point ahead of Tingsryd in the standings.  Each team ended up losing their final match in game winning shots, resulting in Tingsryd being demoted to the 2013–14 Division 1 season.

References

External links

2012-13 HockeyAllsvenskan season
2
Swe